Kristiyan Uzunov (born 4 February 1989) is a Bulgarian footballer who plays as a defender for Vitosha Bistritsa. He was raised in CSKA Sofia's youth teams.

Made his official debut for CSKA in the last match of 2008-09 season in the Bulgarian A PFG (Professional Football Group) against Lokomotiv Mezdra.

International career
Uzunov was formerly part of the Bulgaria national under-19 football team. With the team he participated in the 2008 UEFA European Under-19 Football Championship in the Czech Republic.

References

External links

1989 births
Living people
Bulgarian footballers
First Professional Football League (Bulgaria) players
PFC CSKA Sofia players
PFC Chernomorets Burgas players
FC Pomorie players
Association football defenders
Anagennisi Deryneia FC players
Onisilos Sotira players
FC Oborishte players
FC Vitosha Bistritsa players
Expatriate footballers in Cyprus
Cypriot Second Division players